De Nieuwe en Onbekende Weereld (Dutch) or The New and Unknown World (English) is a book by Arnoldus Montanus. It was published by Jacob van Meurs. It was published, after translation into English, by John Ogilby. The book has 125 engravings made of copper. It has 70 plates and 16 maps.

Full title

Dutch
The full title of the work in Dutch is De Nieuwe en Onbekende Weereld: of Beschryving van America en 't Zuid-Land, Vervaetende d'Oorsprong der Americaenen en Zuid-landers, gedenkwaerdige togten derwaerds, Gelegendheid Der vaste Kusten, Eilanden, Steden, Sterkten, Dorpen, Tempels, Bergen, Fonteinen, Stroomen, Huisen, de natuur van Beesten, Boomen, Planten en vreemde Gewasschen, Gods dienst en Zeden, Wonderlijke Voorvallen, Vereeuwde en Nieuwe Oorlogen: Verciert met Af-beeldsels na 't leven in America gemaekt, en beschreeven door Arnoldus Montanus'''

English
The full title of the work in English is The New and Unknown World: or Description of America and the Southland, Containing the Origin of the Americans and South-landers, remarkable voyages thither, Quality of the Shores, Islands, Cities, Fortresses, Towns, Temples, Mountains, Sources, Rivers, Houses, the nature of Beasts, Trees, Plants and foreign Crops, Religion and Manners, Miraculous Occurrences, Old and New Wars: Adorned with Illustrations drawn from the life in America, and described by Arnoldus Montanus.''

Reception 
"Montanus never visited the New World and his work contains numerous errors and fantastic conceptions about the people and animals of the Americas. Nonetheless, it became a standard work in Europe and was widely read for many years."

Gallery

References

Further reading
  (Index)

1671 books
Dutch non-fiction books